André Julien Victor Delloue (18 April 1899 – 19 February 1974) was a French weightlifter. He competed at the 1920 Summer Olympics and the 1924 Summer Olympics.

References

External links
 

1899 births
1974 deaths
French male weightlifters
Olympic weightlifters of France
Weightlifters at the 1920 Summer Olympics
Weightlifters at the 1924 Summer Olympics
Sportspeople from Roubaix